The Division of Durack is an Australian Electoral Division in the state of Western Australia.

History

The Division is named after the pioneering Durack family, upon whom Dame Mary Durack based her popular historical novels. Created to replace parts of the divisions of Kalgoorlie (which was abolished) and O'Connor, it elected its first member at the 2010 election. It was created as a comfortably safe Liberal seat. Sitting Kalgoorlie MP Barry Haase contested the seat for the Liberals and won. Haase announced he would not recontest Durack at the next election on 15 June 2013. The seat was won at the 2013 election by Liberal candidate Melissa Price. She held the seat without serious difficulty until the 2022 election, when she suffered a swing of over 10 percent to make the seat marginal for the first time.

Geography
Since 1984, federal electoral division boundaries in Australia have been determined at redistributions by a redistribution committee appointed by the Australian Electoral Commission. Redistributions occur for the boundaries of divisions in a particular state, and they occur every seven years, or sooner if a state's representation entitlement changes or when divisions of a state are malapportioned.

In August 2021, the Australian Electoral Commission (AEC) announced that Durack's Wheatbelt Shires of Bruce Rock, Cunderdin, Kellerberrin, Koorda, Kulin, Merredin, Mount Marshall, Mukinbudin, Narembeen, Nungarin, Quairading, Tammin, Trayning, Westonia, Wyalkatchem and Yilgarn and Durack's Mid West Shire of Wiluna would be transferred to the seat of O'Connor, while the Wheatbelt Shires of Chittering, Gingin,  Northam, Toodyay and York would be transferred to Durack from the seat of Pearce. These boundary changes took effect with the next federal election.

Durack presently includes the Kimberley region (Broome, Derby-West Kimberley, Halls Creek, and Wyndham-East Kimberley), the Pilbara region (Ashburton, East Pilbara, Karratha, and Port Hedland), the Gascoyne region (Carnarvon, Exmouth, Shark Bay and Upper Gascoyne), most of the Mid West region (Carnamah, Chapman Valley, Coorow, Cue, Geraldton, Irwin, Meekatharra, Mingenew, Morawa, Mount Magnet, Murchison, Northampton, Perenjori, Sandstone, Three Springs, and Yalgoo), and northern and central parts of the Wheatbelt (Chittering, Dandaragan, Dowerin, Gingin, Goomalling, Moora, Northam, Toodyay, Victoria Plains, Wongan-Ballidu, and York).

At 1,383,954 km2 (over 54 per cent of the landmass of Western Australia), Durack is the largest electorate in Australia by land area, the largest constituency in the world that practices compulsory voting, and the fourth largest single-member electorate in the world after Yakutsk in Russia, Nunavut in Canada, and Alaska in the United States. It is also larger than all Australian states and territories except for Western Australia itself, Queensland and the Northern Territory.

Members

Election results

See also
Electoral district of North West Central for the Western Australian Legislative Assembly, the largest electoral division by area in Western Australia

References

External links
 Division of Durack - Australian Electoral Commission

Electoral divisions of Australia
Constituencies established in 2010
2010 establishments in Australia
Federal politics in Western Australia